Per Martin Sandtrøen (born 5 October 1985) is a Norwegian politician from the Centre Party, currently serving as a deputy member of the Storting since 2017.

Political career
He was elected deputy representative to the Storting in 2017 from the constituency of Hedmark and has been re-elected since. He is currently deputising for Trygve Slagsvold Vedum at the Storting from 2021 while Vedum is serving in government.

In September 2022, he called for the Centre Party to withdraw from government if the European Union's fourth energy package is passed by the government. He received support from the party's county leaders from Rogaland, Troms, Møre og Romsdal and Buskerud.

Personal life
Sandtrøen hails from Tynset, and is a brother of Nils Kristen Sandtrøen. He is a former long-distance runner in the club FIK Ren-Eng, with a personal best of 15:04.38 minutes in the 5000 metres from 2004.

References

1985 births
Living people
People from Tynset
Centre Party (Norway) politicians
Hedmark politicians
Members of the Storting
21st-century Norwegian politicians